Van Vuuren, (Lit, translation: "from Vuren"), is an Afrikaans surname of Dutch (Germanic) origin. The surname originated from the village ‘Vuren’ in the Netherlands.  The surname means beacon or source of light, such as a lighthouse.

Many of the modern related surnames can be traced back to Britain, Ireland and the Netherlands. 

Similar surnames: Van Vuren, Van Buren, Van Vooren, Van Curen, Van Keuren, Van Duren

Notable people with the surname include:

Christiaan Van Vuuren (born 1982), Australian blogger
Dave van Vuuren (born 1990), South African singer
Jaco Janse van Vuuren, South African paralympic athlete
Michael van Vuuren (born 1991), South African rugby union player
PW van Vuuren (born 1988), South African rugby union player
Rob van Vuuren (born 1976), South African actor, comedian, and presenter
Rudie van Vuuren (born 1972), Namibian cricketer, physician and conservationist
Steve van Vuuren (born 1959), South African golfer
Wian van Vuuren (born 1993), Namibian cricketer
Wickus van Vuuren (born 1989), South African cricketer

See also
Marco Jansen van Vuren (born 1996), South African rugby union player
Pieter Jansen van Vuren (born 1991), South African rugby union player
Michael van Vuren (born 1990), South African-born Italian rugby union player

References

Afrikaans-language surnames
Surnames of Dutch origin